Trotskyism first emerged in South Africa in the 1930s.

See also
:Category:Trotskyist organisations in South Africa
:Category:South African Trotskyists

References

External links
 Profiles of Some South African Trotskyists, by Baruch Hirson
 The Trotskyist Groups in South Africa, by Baruch Hirson
 The Origins of South African Trotskyism

 
South Africa
Political movements in South Africa